Ellston is a city in Ringgold County, Iowa, United States. The population was 19 at the time of the 2020 census.

History
In 1881, anticipating the railroad, Cochran & Le Fever built a general store, giving birth to the village of Wirt.  The business failed and was sold six months later, but in March 1882 the Humeston & Shenandoah Railroad established a station here. In 1895 the town's name of Wirt was changed to Ellston so mail would be correctly received, rather than confused with the nearby northeasterly town of Van Wert.

The westerly border of Ellston is county road P-64. This road was originally part of the Dragoon Trace.

Geography
Ellston is located at  (40.840356, -94.108502).

Demographics

As of the census of 2000, there were 57 people, 23 households, and 16 families residing in the city. The racial makeup of the city was 100.00% White.

There were 23 households, out of which 39.1% had children under the age of 18 living with them, 47.8% were married couples living together, 17.4% had a female householder with no husband present, and 30.4% were non-families. 30.4% of all households were made up of individuals, and 17.4% had someone living alone who was 65 years of age or older. The average household size was 2.48 and the average family size was 3.13.

In the city, the population was spread out, with 24.6% under the age of 18, 12.3% from 18 to 24, 26.3% from 25 to 44, 29.8% from 45 to 64, and 7.0% who were 65 years of age or older. The median age was 39 years. For every 100 females, there were 111.1 males. For every 100 females age 18 and over, there were 115.0 males.

The median income for a household in the city was $35,625, and the median income for a family was $45,000. Males had a median income of $14,583 versus $23,571 for females. The per capita income for the city was $10,345. There were 10.0% of families and 17.5% of the population living below the poverty line, including 28.6% of under eighteens and none of those over 64.

Education
Mount Ayr Community School District operates public schools serving the community.

Notable person
Harley A. Wilhelm, Manhattan Project chemist who invented the Ames process for purifying uranium making the atomic bomb possible, was born on a farm near Ellston.

References

Cities in Iowa
Cities in Ringgold County, Iowa
1881 establishments in Iowa